"Black No. 1 (Little Miss Scare-All)" is a single by American gothic metal band Type O Negative from their 1993 album Bloody Kisses. The song was written by lead singer Peter Steele while driving a garbage truck. During an interview with Revolver, he stated "I was waiting in line for three hours to dump 40 cubic yards of human waste at the Hamilton Avenue Marine Transfer Station, and I wrote the song in my head. I'm not kidding you." The lyrics sarcastically detail a relationship with a woman involved with the Goth subculture, loosely based around a relationship Steele was once in, and throws many tongue-in-cheek references to Halloween, Nosferatu, and Lily Munster, as well as quick musical references to Vic Mizzy's The Addams Family Theme as well as Jack Marshall's The Munsters' Theme. It is arguably their best known song; although it never cracked the Billboard Hot 100, it was their best-selling single and was a mainstay on MTV's Headbangers Ball.

Music video
A music video was made for the song, using a radio edit of about four and a half minutes in length as opposed to the eleven-minute recording on the album. Directed by Parris Mayhew, the video was recorded in black and white, with the exception during the breakdown where Peter Steele's eyes appear olive green during a close-up. Close-ups surrounded by shadows alternate with shots of the band performing in a decidedly traditional-looking concert hall, with gothic figures dancing in the background as the band plays classical or acoustic counterparts to their usual instruments; Steele takes advantage of his formidable height during this and plays a double bass as if it were a bass guitar.

Track listing

Personnel
 Peter Steele – lead vocals, bass guitar
 Kenny Hickey – guitar, co-lead vocals
 Josh Silver – keyboards, backing vocals, effects
 Sal Abruscato – drums, percussion

References

External links
 

Type O Negative songs
1993 songs
Songs written by Peter Steele
Roadrunner Records singles
Alternative metal songs